Amazing Tater, known in Japan as , is a puzzle video game for the Game Boy developed and published by Atlus. The game features a password system. It is the sequel to Kwirk.

Gameplay

The player must guide a potato to the exit of each level, which consists of several obstacles. By pushing crates, the player fills up holes that can then be crossed. Different shaped crates and holes create puzzle like situations. The player must also manipulate rotation devices to reach the goal.

There are four different modes in the game. These include a practice mode, a "normal" puzzle mode, a mode specially designed for beginning players and an "action" mode containing two stories: Mega Picnic and Puzzle Forest.

Reception

See also
Eggerland series

References

External links

1991 video games
Atlus games
Fictional tubers
Game Boy-only games
Puzzle video games
Top-down video games
Game Boy games
Fruit and vegetable characters
Video games about food and drink
Video games developed in Japan